Datong District or Tatung is a district of Taipei City, Taiwan. It is located between the Taipei Metro Red Line and eastern shore of the Tamsui River, and between Civic Boulevard and the Sun Yat-sen Freeway. The southern part of this area used to be the site of Twatutia, one of the first settlements in what is now Taipei and for a time the area's commercial center. Taipei's commercial center has since shifted south east to Zhongzheng, Da'an and Xinyi, and Datong is far less important economically. One of the last vestiges of Twatutia's commercial importance disappeared with the closing of the Chien-Cheng Circle in 2006.  The north was the site of the village of Daronpon.

History
During the Qing Dynasty, the district was named Daronpon, Paronpon, and other variants, but was renamed Toaliongtong in 1844. Following the Second Opium War, a port was opened in Twatutia for international trade. Foreign trade resulted in the economic development of the district.

In 1946, the district's name was changed to Tatung, which means "Great Unity", the Confucian notion of utopia which is in the lyrics of the National Anthem of the Republic of China. In 1990, the district merged with neighboring Jiancheng and Yanping Districts to create today's enlarged Datong District. The spelling became "Datong" due to switching to the Pinyin Chinese romanization system.

Administrative divisions
The district consists of Bao'an, Dayou, Guangneng, Guoqing, Guoshun, Jiangong, Jianming, Jiantai, Jingxing, Laoshi, Linjiang, Longhe, Minquan, Nanfang, Penglai, Shuanglian, Siwen, Xingming, Yangya, Yanping, Yongle, Yuquan, Zhaoyang, Zhisheng and Zhongqing Village.

Government institutions
 Ministry of Labor

Tourism
It is most notable for its Japanese period and Qing period architecture, especially along Dihua Street. It is also famous for the Dihua (Tihua) Street Market during the Lunar New Year holidays.  The market sells dried fruits, nuts, dried meats, dried seafood, snacks, and health drinks.

Other attractions in Datong include Tianma Tea House, Taiwan New Cultural Movement Memorial Hall, Chen Tian-lai Residence, Ama Museum, Chiang Wei-shui Memorial Park, Chen Dexing Ancestral Hall, Museum of Contemporary Art Taipei, Customs Museum, Taipei Confucius Temple and Bao-an Temple in the Dalongdong area, the Xia Hai City God Temple and Cisheng Temple in Dadaocheng area. Datong also contains the Qsquare, Yongle Market (also on Dihua Street), Ningxia Night Market, Yansan Night Market and Dalong Night Market.

Transportation

Rail
Datong is served by the following stations of the Taipei Metro:
Shuanglian metro station
Yuanshan metro station
Beimen metro station
Daqiaotou metro station
Zhongshan metro station
Minquan West Road metro station

Road
By road, the district is served by National Highway No. 1, Provincial Highway No. 1, and Provincial Highway No. 2.

It is also the location of the Taipei Bus Station, the largest bus terminal in the city.

Water
The Dadaocheng Wharf is located within the district.

Notable natives
 Chiang Chia, manager of Chinese Taipei national football team (1981–1985)
 Chiang Peng-chien, chairperson of Democratic Progressive Party (1986–1987)
 Frank Hsieh, Premier of the Republic of China (2005–2006)
 Huang Tien-fu, member of Legislative Yuan (1981–1984, 1996–1999)
 Kuo Chin-fa, former singer
 Tsai Eng-meng, businessperson
 Yeh Ching-chuan, Minister of the Department of Health (2008–2009)

Local Food 
 Red Tea House, Bubble tea
 Pineapple cake,

See also

 District (Taiwan)

References

External links 

  
 

Districts of Taipei